is a former member of the Japanese idol girl group AKB48. She is a former member of AKB48's Team A.

Career 
Owada passed AKB48's 15th generation auditions on 19 January 2013. She debuted as a backdancer for Team K's stage performance on 30 April 2013. Her theater debut was on 9 June 2013. On 24 February 2014, it was announced Owada would be promoted to Team B.

In April 2014, she debuted as an actress in Sailor Zombie, a drama about high school students.

On 26 March 2015, it was announced that Owada Nana would be transferred to AKB48 Team A.

On 29 November 2016, Owada announced her graduation.

On 18 March 2017, Owada graduated from the group's Team A.

Owada Nana release her first solo photobook titled "Risutaato" in September.

Discography

AKB48 singles

Appearances

Stage units
AKB48 Kenkyusei Stage 
 
Team B 3rd Stage  (Revival)

TV variety
 AKBingo! (2013–2016 )
  (2013–2016 )
  (2014–2016 )
  (2014–2016 )
 AKB48 Show! (2013–2016 )

TV dramas
  (TV Tokyo, 2014), Maiko
  (NTV, 2015), Zombie
  (NTV, 2015), Zombie
Mashin Sentai Kiramager (TV Asahi, 2020), Yodomehime (episode 10)

Musicals
 AKB49 Stage Play (2014)

References

External links 

  
  
 Asia Promotion personal profile 
 Nana Owada Official blog
 

1999 births
Living people
Japanese idols
Japanese women pop singers
Musicians from Chiba Prefecture
AKB48 members
21st-century Japanese women singers
21st-century Japanese singers